Norman Macdougall is a Scottish historian who is known for writing about Scottish crown politics. He was a senior lecturer in Scottish history at the University of St Andrews.

Macdougall has written biographies of the kings James III of Scotland and James IV of Scotland.  He was also responsible for editing a biography of James V of Scotland.  Other publications include a work on the Auld Alliance, and editing Scotland and War, to which he also contributed an article on James IV's Great Michael.

References

External links 
list of publications

21st-century Scottish historians
Academics of the University of St Andrews
Living people
Year of birth missing (living people)